Schoeffler is a surname. Notable people with the surname include:

Augustin Schoeffler (1822–1851), French saint and martyr
Clifford Schoeffler (1924–2005), American general
Paul Schoeffler (born 1958), Canadian actor

See also
Scheffler

Occupational surnames